Suzy McCoppin (born June 20, 1974) is an American actress and columnist whose subjects typically deal with nightlife, dating, and sex.

Early life
McCoppin was born in San Francisco, California and raised in the suburban town of Birmingham, Michigan. She attended Marian High School, an all-girls Catholic prep school. After graduating, she majored in drama at the Tisch School of the Arts at New York University and graduated in 1998.

Career
McCoppin's early career began as an actress, doing commercials and bit parts on TV shows such as The Sopranos and Entourage. She also worked as a body double for stars such as Kim Cattrall, Kate Moss, and Ashley Judd. Between 2001 and 2010, she appeared in several films for the New Jersey-based production company Seduction Cinema, under the name Julian Wells. Later in her career, McCoppin covered nightlife for celebrity magazines such as Life & Style and In Touch, and served as a Los Angeles correspondent for British publications such as The Daily Mail and The Sun. In 2008, McCoppin became a nightlife and sex columnist for Playboy magazine, as well as a comedic online personality. She was a regular contributor to Playboy radio on Sirius and wrote articles for the pop culture website Popdust. McCoppin also hosted the Under Cover With Suzy McCoppin podcast for twenty-three episodes through July 2014.

In 2014, McCoppin and co-author Allison Swan co-wrote a book titled KissnTell, a work of fiction released digitally through publisher Full Fathom Five. The television rights to the book were purchased by E! with the intention of adapting it into a scripted television series.

Charity work
McCoppin is a human rights advocate and has volunteered as a Freedom Writer for Amnesty International. She is a member of Food on Foot, a Los Angeles-based charity dedicated to helping the homeless. McCoppin has also dedicated much of her time to rescuing abused and neglected animals.

References

External links
 http://popdust.com/
 http://www.gamespeopleplayhollywood.com/html/suzy.html
 http://voiceplate.com/
 
 
 

1978 births
Living people
American columnists
American television actresses
People from Birmingham, Michigan
Actresses from San Francisco
American women columnists
21st-century American women